The Volgograd Honour Guard, officially known as the Honour Guard Company of the 20th Separate Guards Motor Rifle Brigade is a ceremonial unit of the Russian Armed Forces that is subordinate to the 20th Guards Motor Rifle Brigade of the Southern Military District. Its main task is to guard the Mamayev Kurgan Memorial Complex from 9AM to 8PM and to participate in the escorting of special guests to Volgograd. In addition, the personnel of the company take part in commemorations and events held in the Southern Military District. All 100 members of the company have to be at least . The company uses uniforms from the 154th Preobrazhensky Independent Commandant's Regiment, though not directly associated with it.

From its formation on January 29, 1968, to its transfer to the 20th Guards Motor Rifle Brigade on December 1, 2010, the company was designated as the 46th Separate Honour Guard Company and directly subordinate to the district headquarters.

Gallery

See also
 154th Preobrazhensky Independent Commandant's Regiment
 Kremlin Regiment
 Guard of honour

References

External links 

 Рота Почетного караула Волгоград on YouTube

Army units and formations of Russia
Russian ceremonial units
Military units and formations established in 1968
1968 establishments in Russia